The House Without a Key is a 1925 novel by Earl Derr Biggers, the first of the Charlie Chan mysteries. Set in 1920s Hawaii, the novel acquaints the reader with the look and feel of the islands from the standpoint of both white and non-white inhabitants, describing social class structures and customs of the era.

Plot summary
The novel deals with the murder of a former member of Boston society who has lived in Hawaii for a number of years.  The main character is the victim's nephew, a straitlaced young Bostonian bond trader, who came to the islands to try to convince his aunt Minerva, whose vacation has extended many months, to return to Boston.  The nephew, John Quincy Winterslip, soon falls under the spell of the islands himself, meets an attractive young woman, breaks his engagement to his straitlaced Bostonian fiancee Agatha, and decides as the murder is being solved to move to San Francisco.  In the interval, he is introduced to many levels of Hawaiian society and is of some assistance to Detective Charlie Chan in solving the mystery.

The novel's denouement is nearly identical to that in the final Perry Mason novel by Erle Stanley Gardner, The Case of the Postponed Murder (1970).

Adaptations
It was adapted for film twice, as The House Without a Key in 1926 and as Charlie Chan's Greatest Case in 1933. In 1942 it was adapted for the stage by Jean Lee Latham, and played in Chicago. Another dramatisation by Hal Glatzer played at the Left Coast Crime Conference in Hawai'i in 2009.

Trivia 
Charlie Chan does not speak his first word until page 82 (first paperback edition).

The novel was written by Biggers at the Halekulani hotel on Waikīkī Beach which features a restaurant named "House Without a Key".

References

External links 
 
 
 Charlie Chan, The Enduring Detective by Marv Lachman

1925 American novels
Charlie Chan novels
American novels adapted into films
Novels set in Hawaii
Novels set in the 1920s
Bobbs-Merrill Company books